The 1999 State of the Union Address was given by the 42nd president of the United States, Bill Clinton, on January 19, 1999, at 9:00 p.m. EST, in the chamber of the United States House of Representatives to the 106th United States Congress. It was Clinton's sixth State of the Union Address and his seventh speech to a joint session of the United States Congress. Presiding over this joint session was the House speaker, Dennis Hastert, accompanied by Al Gore, the vice president, in his capacity as the president of the Senate.

President Clinton discussed the economy, the federal budget, taxes and focused on the budget surplus, then at $70 billion. The president also discussed the future of Social Security, education, foreign relations and "solving the so-called Y2K computer problem". The president did not mention the then-occurring impeachment trial in the Senate.

The speech lasted 1:18:40 and consisted of 7,514 words. In the speech, the president acknowledged the widows of the officers killed in the United States Capitol shooting incident of 1998.

Before the speech, President Clinton shook hands with Speaker Hastert and Vice President Gore.  Speaker Hastert introduced the president with the traditional words "I have the high privilege and the distinct honor of presenting to you the president of the United States".  After the speech, Hastert and Gore shook hands with the president.

The Republican Party response was delivered by Representatives Jennifer Dunn and Steve Largent in Washington, D.C.

Andrew Cuomo, the Secretary of Housing and Urban Development, served as the designated survivor.

References

External links

Transcript of the 1999 State of the Union address
Coverage by the NewsHour with Jim Lehrer
Entire 1999 State of the Union Response (transcript)
Entire 1999 State of the Union address (video) at C-SPAN
Entire 1999 State of the Union Response (video) at C-SPAN
(full video and audio), Miller Center of Public Affairs, University of Virginia.

State of the Union Address 1999
State of the Union Address
State of the Union Address
State of the Union Address
State of the Union Address
Articles containing video clips
State of the Union Address
Presidency of Bill Clinton
State of the Union Address 1999
1999